Sáenz Peña is a station on Line A of the Buenos Aires Underground. It is the last station of the line located under the Avenida de Mayo in the neighbourhood of Monserrat. The station belonged to the inaugural section of the Buenos Aires Underground opened on 1 December 1913, which linked the stations Plaza Miserere and Plaza de Mayo.

References

External links

Buenos Aires Underground stations
Railway stations opened in 1913
1913 establishments in Argentina